Oberea discoidalis is a species of beetle in the family Cerambycidae. It was described by Karl Jordan in 1894. It is known from the Republic of the Congo, Gabon, Cameroon, the Ivory Coast, and Sierra Leone. It contains the variety Oberea discoidalis var. occidentalis.

References

discoidalis
Beetles described in 1894